Sete Cidades may refer to:

 Sete Cidades (Ponta Delgada), a civil parish in the municipality of Ponta Delgada (Azores), Portugal
 Sete Cidades Massif, Azores, a stratovolcanic complex
 Sete Cidades National Park, national park in the state of Piauí, Brazil